Nadeyeyvo is a rural locality (a settlement) in Podlesnoye Rural Settlement, Vologodsky District, Vologda Oblast, Russia. The population was 1,540 as of 2002. There are 8 streets.

Geography 
Nadeyeyvo is located 17 km southeast of Vologda (the district's administrative centre) by road. Mikhalevo is the nearest rural locality.

References 

Rural localities in Vologodsky District